The Sport of Kings is a 2016 novel by C. E. Morgan. It is a family saga about horse racing set in Kentucky and Ohio.

It won the 2016 Kirkus Prize for Fiction and was a finalist for the 2017 Pulitzer Prize for Fiction.

Reception
In its starred review, Kirkus Reviews called the novel "vaultingly ambitious, thrillingly well-written, charged with moral fervor and rueful compassion."

Publishers Weekly praised the novel's "authentically pungent shed-row atmosphere" but criticized its "series of melodramatic incidents that undermines the care with which Morgan has created these larger-than-life characters."

Awards and nominations
 Winner, 2016 Kirkus Prize for Fiction
 Finalist, 2017 Pulitzer Prize for Fiction
 Shortlist, 2017 Women's Prize for Fiction
 Shortlist, 2017 Rathbones Folio Prize
 Longlist, 2017 Andrew Carnegie Medals for Excellence in Fiction
 Nominee, 2016 James Tait Black Memorial Prize for Fiction

References

2016 American novels
Horse racing novels
Kirkus Prize-winning works
Farrar, Straus and Giroux books
Novels set in Kentucky
Novels set in Ohio
Family saga novels
Novels about American slavery